John Arthur Blaikie (1849 – 25 December 1917) was an English poet and journalist, born in Poplar, Middlesex, and died in Kensington.

Works
Madrigals, Songs, and Sonnets (1870), co-author Edmund Gosse
Love's Victory (1890)
A Sextet of Singers (1895)

References

Citations

Sources 

 1881 British Census / Middlesex. URL accessed 2006-03-12.
 
 Cousin, John W. A Short Biographical Dictionary of English Literature. 1910. - via Project Gutenberg

External links 
 

1849 births
1917 deaths
English male journalists
English male poets